Hockey Day Minnesota is an annual event in Minnesota run in cooperation with the Minnesota Wild and Bally Sports North that celebrates the sport of hockey throughout the state. Now a multi-day showcase, the event is held in mid-to-late January or early February and typically consists of multiple high school games (a mixture of boys and girls), a men's and/or women's college hockey game, and concludes with a Minnesota Wild NHL game. With some games now taking place on Thursday and Friday, the main set of games are played on a Saturday and are broadcast on FSN. Most of the games are played at a featured outdoor location with a rink built specifically for the event. However, some of the college matchups are played in standard home arenas and all of the Wild games are played in a NHL venue (usually Xcel Energy Center).

2007 Hockey Day Minnesota (Baudette) January 20, 2007
Hockey Day Minnesota 2007 was the 1st of the series and was played outside on Baudette Bay.

2008 Hockey Day Minnesota (Baudette Bay) February 9, 2008

2009 Hockey Day Minnesota (St. Paul) January 17, 2009

2010 Hockey Day Minnesota (Hermantown) January 23, 2010

2011 Hockey Day Minnesota (Moorhead) February 12, 2011

2012 Hockey Day Minnesota (Lake Minnetonka/Excelsior) January 21, 2012
The games, normally played outdoors, had to be moved indoors due to warm weather causing poor ice conditions.

2013 Hockey Day Minnesota (Grand Rapids) January 19, 2013

The 2013 HDM broadcast included the Season/Home Opener for the Minnesota Wild for the 2013 NHL season after the 2012-2013 NHL Lockout was resolved.  This year also included the last WCHA (regular season) meeting between Minnesota and North Dakota before Minnesota moved to the Big Ten Hockey Conference, and North Dakota moved to the National Collegiate Hockey Conference in 2013–2014.

2014 Hockey Day Minnesota (Elk River) January 18, 2014

2014 Hockey Day Minnesota was hosted at Handke Pit.

Elk River native Nate Prosser scored the game-winning goal in the Minnesota Wild game against the Dallas Stars in a 3–2 overtime victory.

2015 Hockey Day Minnesota (St. Paul) January 17, 2015

The official name for Hockey Day Minnesota 2015 is "St. Paul to Kuwait" to celebrate Minnesota troops' service in Iraq and Kuwait. Fox Sports North personalities and crew broadcast the Wild game in Kuwait around 5 AM local time for the stationed troops to watch.

2016 Hockey Day Minnesota (Duluth) February 6, 2016
Hockey Day Minnesota 2016 was the 10th of the series and was played outside in Bayfront Park.

2017 Hockey Day Minnesota (Stillwater) January 21, 2017
Hockey Day Minnesota 2017 was the 11th of the series and was played outside in Lowell Park.

2018 Hockey Day Minnesota (Saint Cloud) January 19/20, 2018 
Hockey Day Minnesota 2018 was the 12th of the series and was played outside next to Lake George.

2019 Hockey Day Minnesota (Bemidji) January 19, 2019 
Hockey Day Minnesota 2019 is the 13th of the series and was played outside on the shores of Lake Bemidji.

2020 Hockey Day Minnesota (Minneapolis) January 16/17/18, 2020 
Hockey Day Minnesota 2020 was the 14th of the series and was played outside at Parade Stadium.

2022 Hockey Day Minnesota (Mankato), January 19–23, 2022 
Hockey Day Minnesota 2022 was the 15th of the series, with all games in the event except for the NHL game played outdoors at Blakeslee Stadium on the Minnesota State University campus. The event was originally scheduled for 2021 but was postponed due to COVID-19.

References

External links 
 Minnesota Wild Hockey Day Page

Minnesota Wild games
Ice hockey in Minnesota
2007 establishments in Minnesota
Recurring sporting events established in 2007